The following is a list of players, both past and current, who appeared at least in one game for the Chicago Bulls NBA franchise.



Players
Note: Statistics are correct through the end of the  season.

A to B

|-
|align="left"| || align="center"|G || align="left"|Loyola Marymount || align="center"|2 || align="center"|– || 67 || 958 || 95 || 91 || 296 || 14.3 || 1.4 || 1.4 || 4.4 || align=center|
|-
|align="left"| || align="center"|F || align="left"|West Virginia || align="center"|1 || align="center"| || 8 || 29 || 5 || 2 || 4 || 3.6 || 0.6 || 0.3 || 0.5 || align=center|
|-
|align="left"| || align="center"|G || align="left"|Arizona || align="center"|1 || align="center"| || 10 || 120 || 26 || 13 || 37 || 12.0 || 2.6 || 1.3 || 3.7 || align=center|
|-
|align="left"| || align="center"|F/C || align="left"|Villanova || align="center"|2 || align="center"|– || 114 || 1,339 || 259 || 36 || 508 || 11.7 || 2.3 || 0.3 || 4.5 || align=center|
|-
|align="left"| || align="center"|F/C || align="left"|UNLV || align="center"|2 || align="center"|– || 2 || 3 || 1 || 0 || 0 || 1.5 || 0.5 || 0.0 || 0.0 || align=center|
|-
|align="left"| || align="center"|C || align="left"|Australia || align="center"|1 || align="center"| || 73 || 1,007 || 280 || 65 || 439 || 13.8 || 3.8 || 0.9 || 6.0 || align=center|
|-
|align="left"| || align="center"|G || align="left"|UNLV || align="center"|1 || align="center"| || 36 || 961 || 88 || 203 || 302 || 26.7 || 2.4 || 5.6 || 8.4 || align=center|
|-
|align="left" bgcolor="#CCFFCC"|x || align="center"|G || align="left"|Villanova || align="center"|2 || align="center"|– || 105 || 2,265 || 244 || 304 || 592 || 21.6 || 2.3 || 2.9 || 5.6 || align=center|
|-
|align="left"| || align="center"|F/C || align="left"|Cincinnati || align="center"|1 || align="center"| || 14 || 116 || 32 || 7 || 18 || 8.3 || 2.3 || 0.5 || 1.3 || align=center|
|-
|align="left" bgcolor="#FFCC00"|+ || align="center"|G || align="left"|Iowa || align="center"|7 || align="center"|– || 518 || 13,319 || 948 || 1,741 || 5,553 || 25.7 || 1.8 || 3.4 || 10.7 || align=center|
|-
|align="left"| || align="center"|G || align="left"|Duke || align="center"|2 || align="center"|– || 92 || 975 || 88 || 105 || 350 || 10.6 || 1.0 || 1.1 || 3.8 || align=center|
|-
|align="left"| || align="center"|F || align="left"|St. John's || align="center"|3 || align="center"|– || 175 || 5,424 || 733 || 507 || 2,194 || 31.0 || 4.2 || 2.9 || 12.5 || align=center|
|-
|align="left"| || align="center"|C || align="left"|Turkey || align="center"|3 || align="center"|– || 152 || 2,021 || 666 || 65 || 438 || 13.3 || 4.4 || 0.4 || 2.9 || align=center|
|-
|align="left"| || align="center"|G || align="left"|Texas || align="center"|1 || align="center"| || 61 || 1,857 || 126 || 303 || 909 || 30.4 || 2.1 || 5.0 || 14.9 || align=center|
|-
|align="left"| || align="center"|C || align="left"|Santa Clara || align="center"|3 || align="center"|– || 173 || 2,966 || 722 || 348 || 641 || 17.1 || 4.2 || 2.0 || 3.7 || align=center|
|-
|align="left"| || align="center"|C || align="left"|Croatia || align="center"|3 || align="center"|– || 95 || 973 || 238 || 37 || 251 || 10.2 || 2.5 || 0.4 || 2.6 || align=center|
|-
|align="left"| || align="center"|F/C || align="left"|New Mexico || align="center"|2 || align="center"|– || 36 || 167 || 36 || 7 || 44 || 4.6 || 1.0 || 0.2 || 1.2 || align=center|
|-
|align="left"| || align="center"|G/F || align="left"|Duke || align="center"|2 || align="center"|– || 145 || 3,961 || 668 || 421 || 1,505 || 27.3 || 4.6 || 2.9 || 10.4 || align=center|
|-
|align="left"| || align="center"|F/C || align="left"|UTEP || align="center"|2 || align="center"|– || 47 || 823 || 234 || 29 || 370 || 17.5 || 5.0 || 0.6 || 7.9 || align=center|
|-
|align="left"| || align="center"|G || align="left"|Seton Hall || align="center"|1 || align="center"| || 6 || 29 || 5 || 7 || 8 || 4.8 || 0.8 || 1.2 || 1.3 || align=center|
|-
|align="left"| || align="center"|G || align="left"|Oregon State || align="center"|1 || align="center"| || 37 || 1,181 || 144 || 116 || 412 || 31.9 || 3.9 || 3.1 || 11.1 || align=center|
|-
|align="left"| || align="center"|G || align="left"|Charlotte || align="center"|1 || align="center"| || 19 || 141 || 28 || 8 || 39 || 7.4 || 1.5 || 0.4 || 2.1 || align=center|
|-
|align="left"| || align="center"|F || align="left"|Temple || align="center"|2 || align="center"|– || 65 || 556 || 129 || 31 || 292 || 8.6 || 2.0 || 0.5 || 4.5 || align=center|
|-
|align="left"| || align="center"|F || align="left"|Maryland || align="center"|2 || align="center"|– || 69 || 829 || 200 || 21 || 322 || 12.0 || 2.9 || 0.3 || 4.7 || align=center|
|-
|align="left"| || align="center"|G/F || align="left"|Italy || align="center"|1 || align="center"| || 73 || 1,882 || 140 || 148 || 702 || 25.8 || 1.9 || 2.0 || 9.6 || align=center|
|-
|align="left"| || align="center"|G || align="left"|Jacksonville || align="center"|2 || align="center"|– || 115 || 1,838 || 214 || 183 || 628 || 16.0 || 1.9 || 1.6 || 5.5 || align=center|
|-
|align="left"| || align="center"|G || align="left"|Oregon State || align="center"|3 || align="center"|– || 144 || 2,039 || 228 || 133 || 795 || 14.2 || 1.6 || 0.9 || 5.5 || align=center|
|-
|align="left"| || align="center"|F || align="left"|Arizona State || align="center"|1 || align="center"| || 3 || 19 || 5 || 0 || 7 || 6.3 || 1.7 || 0.0 || 2.3 || align=center|
|-
|align="left"| || align="center"|G || align="left"|California (PA) || align="center"|1 || align="center"| || 68 || 869 || 63 || 139 || 244 || 12.8 || 0.9 || 2.0 || 3.6 || align=center|
|-
|align="left"| || align="center"|G || align="left"|Georgia Tech || align="center"|1 || align="center"| || 30 || 793 || 81 || 149 || 279 || 26.4 || 2.7 || 5.0 || 9.3 || align=center|
|-
|align="left"| || align="center"|G || align="left"|LSU || align="center"|2 || align="center"|– || 76 || 1,143 || 139 || 62 || 569 || 15.0 || 1.8 || 0.8 || 7.5 || align=center|
|-
|align="left"| || align="center"|F || align="left"|LSU || align="center"|1 || align="center"| || 2 || 13 || 3 || 1 || 6 || 6.5 || 1.5 || 0.5 || 3.0 || align=center|
|-
|align="left"| || align="center"|F/C || align="left"|USC || align="center"|2 || align="center"|– || 52 || 889 || 216 || 44 || 409 || 17.1 || 4.2 || 0.8 || 7.9 || align=center|
|-
|align="left"| || align="center"|F || align="left"|Cincinnati || align="center"|4 || align="center"|–– || 231 || 3,171 || 845 || 211 || 793 || 13.7 || 3.7 || 0.9 || 3.4 || align=center|
|-
|align="left"| || align="center"|G || align="left"|Oregon State || align="center"|1 || align="center"| || 49 || 546 || 41 || 68 || 226 || 11.1 || 0.8 || 1.4 || 4.6 || align=center|
|-
|align="left"| || align="center"|C || align="left"|Tennessee || align="center"|10 || align="center"|– || 635 || 14,387 || 5,745 || 2,007 || 4,596 || 22.7 || 9.0 || 3.2 || 7.2 || align=center|
|-
|align="left"| || align="center"|G/F || align="left"|Kentucky || align="center"|1 || align="center"| || 82 || 1,461 || 148 || 101 || 359 || 17.8 || 1.8 || 1.2 || 4.4 || align=center|
|-
|align="left"| || align="center"|F || align="left"|Maryland || align="center"|2 || align="center"|– || 45 || 449 || 97 || 39 || 130 || 10.0 || 2.2 || 0.9 || 2.9 || align=center|
|-
|align="left" bgcolor="#FFCC00"|+ || align="center"|F || align="left"|Kansas State || align="center"|3 || align="center"|– || 236 || 8,311 || 2,049 || 367 || 4,807 || 35.2 || 8.7 || 1.6 || 20.4 || align=center|
|-
|align="left"| || align="center"|F/C || align="left"|Duke || align="center"|4 || align="center"|– || 280 || 8,517 || 2,532 || 567 || 4,347 || 30.4 || 9.0 || 2.0 || 15.5 || align=center|
|-
|align="left"| || align="center"|C || align="left"|Wichita State || align="center"|1 || align="center"| || 9 || 65 || 28 || 2 || 22 || 7.2 || 3.1 || 0.2 || 2.4 || align=center|
|-
|align="left"| || align="center"|G/F || align="left"|North Carolina || align="center"|1 || align="center"| || 58 || 683 || 105 || 106 || 201 || 11.8 || 1.8 || 1.8 || 3.5 || align=center|
|-
|align="left"| || align="center"|F || align="left"|Duke || align="center"|2 || align="center"|– || 155 || 5,905 || 1,556 || 395 || 3,117 || 38.1 || 10.0 || 2.5 || 20.1 || align=center|
|-
|align="left"| || align="center"|G || align="left"|Stanford || align="center"|1 || align="center"| || 15 || 140 || 19 || 23 || 39 || 9.3 || 1.3 || 1.5 || 2.6 || align=center|
|-
|align="left"| || align="center"|G || align="left"|Arkansas || align="center"|1 || align="center"| || 4 || 18 || 0 || 0 || 7 || 4.5 || 0.0 || 0.0 || 1.8 || align=center|
|-
|align="left"| || align="center"|G/F || align="left"|Arkansas || align="center"|3 || align="center"|– || 148 || 3,418 || 493 || 277 || 958 || 23.1 || 3.3 || 1.9 || 6.5 || align=center|
|-
|align="left"| || align="center"|G || align="left"|Oregon || align="center"|2 || align="center"|– || 151 || 2,993 || 267 || 441 || 1,445 || 19.8 || 1.8 || 2.9 || 9.6 || align=center|
|-
|align="left"| || align="center"|G || align="left"|UTSA || align="center"|1 || align="center"| || 11 || 93 || 15 || 7 || 20 || 8.5 || 1.4 || 0.6 || 1.8 || align=center|
|-
|align="left"| || align="center"|F || align="left"|Missouri || align="center"|1 || align="center"| || 77 || 1,265 || 238 || 104 || 388 || 16.4 || 3.1 || 1.4 || 5.0 || align=center|
|-
|align="left"| || align="center"|F/C || align="left"|George Washington || align="center"|2 || align="center"|– || 108 || 1,409 || 373 || 52 || 455 || 13.0 || 3.5 || 0.5 || 4.2 || align=center|
|-
|align="left"| || align="center"|F/C || align="left"|Louisiana Tech || align="center"|1 || align="center"| || 72 || 1,456 || 347 || 48 || 436 || 20.2 || 4.8 || 0.7 || 6.1 || align=center|
|-
|align="left"| || align="center"|G || align="left"|New Mexico State || align="center"|5 || align="center"|– || 309 || 5,639 || 547 || 708 || 1,535 || 18.2 || 1.8 || 2.3 || 5.0 || align=center|
|-
|align="left"| || align="center"|C || align="left"|Kansas || align="center"|1 || align="center"| || 4 || 37 || 10 || 1 || 2 || 9.3 || 2.5 || 0.3 || 0.5 || align=center|
|-
|align="left"| || align="center"|G || align="left"|Michigan State || align="center"|1 || align="center"| || 6 || 22 || 2 || 0 || 9 || 3.7 || 0.3 || 0.0 || 1.5 || align=center|
|-
|align="left"| || align="center"|G/F || align="left"|Arkansas || align="center"|1 || align="center"| || 10 || 132 || 16 || 14 || 45 || 13.2 || 1.6 || 1.4 || 4.5 || align=center|
|-
|align="left"| || align="center"|G || align="left"|Temple || align="center"|2 || align="center"|– || 54 || 598 || 56 || 116 || 174 || 11.1 || 1.0 || 2.1 || 3.2 || align=center|
|-
|align="left"| || align="center"|F/C || align="left"|Seton Hall || align="center"|1 || align="center"| || 45 || 1,204 || 232 || 48 || 407 || 26.8 || 5.2 || 1.1 || 9.0 || align=center|
|-
|align="left"| || align="center"|C || align="left"|San Francisco || align="center"|1 || align="center"| || 29 || 317 || 80 || 13 || 118 || 10.9 || 2.8 || 0.4 || 4.1 || align=center|
|-
|align="left"| || align="center"|G/F || align="left"|Arizona || align="center"|4 || align="center"|– || 281 || 2,656 || 412 || 215 || 832 || 9.5 || 1.5 || 0.8 || 3.0 || align=center|
|-
|align="left"| || align="center"|G || align="left"|Louisville || align="center"|1 || align="center"| || 6 || 30 || 6 || 5 || 5 || 5.0 || 1.0 || 0.8 || 0.8 || align=center|
|-
|align="left"| || align="center"|G || align="left"|Northwestern || align="center"|1 || align="center"| || 3 || 11 || 2 || 1 || 4 || 3.7 || 0.7 || 0.3 || 1.3 || align=center|
|-
|align="left"| || align="center"|G/F || align="left"|UConn || align="center"|1 || align="center"| || 80 || 1,096 || 198 || 65 || 416 || 13.7 || 2.5 || 0.8 || 5.2 || align=center|
|-
|align="left" bgcolor="#FFCC00"|+ || align="center"|G/F || align="left"|Marquette || align="center"|6 || align="center"|– || 399 || 12,880 || 1,921 || 1,254 || 6,208 || 32.3 || 4.8 || 3.1 || 15.6 || align=center|
|-
|align="left"| || align="center"|G/F || align="left"|La Salle || align="center"|1 || align="center"| || 6 || 26 || 1 || 0 || 16 || 4.3 || 0.2 || 0.0 || 2.7 || align=center|
|}

C to D

|-
|align="left"| || align="center"|F || align="left"|Alabama || align="center"|3 || align="center"|– || 183 || 2,660 || 585 || 149 || 999 || 14.5 || 3.2 || 0.8 || 5.5 || align=center|
|-
|align="left"| || align="center"|G || align="left"|Murray State || align="center"|1 || align="center"| || 39 || 592 || 50 || 37 || 181 || 15.2 || 1.3 || 0.9 || 4.6 || align=center|
|-
|align="left"| || align="center"|G || align="left"|Southern Illinois || align="center"|1 || align="center"| || 50 || 1,092 || 160 || 81 || 492 || 21.8 || 3.2 || 1.6 || 9.8 || align=center|
|-
|align="left"| || align="center"|G || align="left"|Texas Tech || align="center"|1 || align="center"| || 42 || 624 || 49 || 66 || 171 || 14.9 || 1.2 || 1.6 || 4.1 || align=center|
|-
|align="left" bgcolor="#CCFFCC"|x || align="center"|C || align="left"|Duke || align="center"|1 || align="center"| || 44 || 1,110 || 307 || 78 || 455 || 25.2 || 7.0 || 1.8 || 10.3 || align=center|
|-
|align="left"| || align="center"|G || align="left"|Syracuse || align="center"|1 || align="center"| || 45 || 846 || 153 || 113 || 297 || 18.8 || 3.4 || 2.5 || 6.6 || align=center|
|-
|align="left"| || align="center"|C || align="left"|San Francisco || align="center"|6 || align="center"|– || 397 || 10,270 || 2,181 || 588 || 3,638 || 25.9 || 5.5 || 1.5 || 9.2 || align=center|
|-
|align="left"| || align="center"|C || align="left"|Manuel Dominguez HS (CA) || align="center"|5 || align="center"|– || 340 || 8,308 || 2,616 || 299 || 2,397 || 24.4 || 7.7 || 0.9 || 7.1 || align=center|
|-
|align="left"| || align="center"|F/C || align="left"|Wake Forest || align="center"|1 || align="center"| || 19 || 179 || 38 || 12 || 94 || 9.4 || 2.0 || 0.6 || 4.9 || align=center|
|-
|align="left"| || align="center"|F || align="left"|Ohio Wesleyan || align="center"|3 || align="center"|– || 213 || 4,061 || 894 || 262 || 1,717 || 19.1 || 4.2 || 1.2 || 8.1 || align=center|
|-
|align="left"| || align="center"|G || align="left"|Eastern Michigan || align="center"|1 || align="center"| || 5 || 27 || 5 || 4 || 4 || 5.4 || 1.0 || 0.8 || 0.8 || align=center|
|-
|align="left"| || align="center"|G || align="left"|New Mexico State || align="center"|2 || align="center"|– || 74 || 612 || 66 || 70 || 281 || 8.3 || 0.9 || 0.9 || 3.8 || align=center|
|-
|align="left"| || align="center"|G || align="left"|New Mexico State || align="center"|1 || align="center"| || 27 || 473 || 42 || 94 || 131 || 17.5 || 1.6 || 3.5 || 4.9 || align=center|
|-
|align="left"| || align="center"|G || align="left"|Ohio State || align="center"|1 || align="center"| || 33 || 276 || 43 || 9 || 82 || 8.4 || 1.3 || 0.3 || 2.5 || align=center|
|-
|align="left"| || align="center"|C || align="left"|DePaul || align="center"|7 || align="center"|– || 556 || 15,039 || 3,529 || 1,112 || 5,457 || 27.0 || 6.3 || 2.0 || 9.8 || align=center|
|-
|align="left"| || align="center"|F || align="left"|Southern Miss || align="center"|1 || align="center"| || 5 || 34 || 2 || 1 || 11 || 6.8 || 0.4 || 0.2 || 2.2 || align=center|
|-
|align="left"| || align="center"|G || align="left"|Michigan || align="center"|4 || align="center"|– || 244 || 6,334 || 591 || 935 || 2,737 || 26.0 || 2.4 || 3.8 || 11.2 || align=center|
|-
|align="left"| || align="center"|F/C || align="left"|Detroit Mercy || align="center"|1 || align="center"| || 43 || 1,105 || 227 || 70 || 297 || 25.7 || 5.3 || 1.6 || 6.9 || align=center|
|-
|align="left"| || align="center"|C || align="left"|Thornwood HS (IL) || align="center"|4 || align="center"|– || 289 || 6,683 || 1,414 || 167 || 3,414 || 23.1 || 4.9 || 0.6 || 11.8 || align=center|
|-
|align="left"| || align="center"|G || align="left"|San Francisco || align="center"|4 || align="center"|– || 272 || 7,354 || 771 || 792 || 4,473 || 27.0 || 2.8 || 2.9 || 16.4 || align=center|
|-
|align="left"| || align="center"|F || align="left"|Hungary || align="center"|2 || align="center"|– || 76 || 1,345 || 246 || 56 || 476 || 17.7 || 3.2 || 0.7 || 6.3 || align=center|
|-
|align="left"| || align="center"|F/C || align="left"|UTEP || align="center"|2 || align="center"|– || 137 || 3,875 || 956 || 203 || 1,080 || 28.3 || 7.0 || 1.5 || 7.9 || align=center|
|-
|align="left"| || align="center"|F || align="left"|Vanderbilt || align="center"|2 || align="center"|– || 102 || 974 || 195 || 49 || 315 || 9.5 || 1.9 || 0.5 || 3.1 || align=center|
|-
|align="left"| || align="center"|G/F || align="left"|UCLA || align="center"|1 || align="center"| || 1 || 7 || 1 || 1 || 0 || 7.0 || 1.0 || 1.0 || 0.0 || align=center|
|-
|align="left" bgcolor="#FFCC00"|+ || align="center"|F || align="left"|Duke || align="center"|10 || align="center"|– || 637 || 22,882 || 4,078 || 1,572 || 10,286 || 35.9 || 6.4 || 2.5 || 16.1 || align=center|
|-
|align="left"| || align="center"|F || align="left"|Cincinnati || align="center"|1 || align="center"| || 25 || 220 || 48 || 10 || 68 || 8.8 || 1.9 || 0.4 || 2.7 || align=center|
|-
|align="left"| || align="center"|F/C || align="left"|San Jose State || align="center"|3 || align="center"|– || 235 || 4,072 || 816 || 421 || 1,138 || 17.3 || 3.5 || 1.8 || 4.8 || align=center|
|-
|align="left"| || align="center"|F || align="left"|Voorhees || align="center"|1 || align="center"| || 18 || 89 || 20 || 7 || 45 || 4.9 || 1.1 || 0.4 || 2.5 || align=center|
|-
|align="left"| || align="center"|G || align="left"|Valparaiso || align="center"|1 || align="center"| || 48 || 1,305 || 69 || 185 || 302 || 27.2 || 1.4 || 3.9 || 6.3 || align=center|
|-
|align="left"| || align="center"|G || align="left"|Washington || align="center"|1 || align="center"| || 43 || 684 || 86 || 116 || 118 || 15.9 || 2.0 || 2.7 || 2.7 || align=center|
|-
|align="left"| || align="center"|G || align="left"|Duke || align="center"|4 || align="center"|– || 300 || 7,728 || 718 || 1,344 || 2,077 || 25.8 || 2.4 || 4.5 || 6.9 || align=center|
|-
|align="left"| || align="center"|G/F || align="left"|Duke || align="center"|3 || align="center"|– || 176 || 5,125 || 676 || 339 || 1,746 || 29.1 || 3.8 || 1.9 || 9.9 || align=center|
|-
|align="left" bgcolor="#CCFFCC"|x || align="center"|G || align="left"|Providence || align="center"|2 || align="center"|– || 98 || 2,914 || 408 || 587 || 1,218 || 29.7 || 4.2 || 6.0 || 12.4 || align=center|
|-
|align="left"| || align="center"|F || align="left"|LSU || align="center"|1 || align="center"| || 47 || 893 || 167 || 55 || 292 || 19.0 || 3.6 || 1.2 || 6.2 || align=center|
|}

E to G

|-
|align="left"| || align="center"|G/F || align="left"|Virginia Tech || align="center"|1 || align="center"| || 1 || 3 || 0 || 0 || 0 || 3.0 || 0.0 || 0.0 || 0.0 || align=center|
|-
|align="left"| || align="center"|F/C || align="left"|Washington || align="center"|1 || align="center"| || 28 || 274 || 40 || 11 || 98 || 9.8 || 1.4 || 0.4 || 3.5 || align=center|
|-
|align="left"| || align="center"|G || align="left"|UConn || align="center"|1 || align="center"| || 50 || 936 || 81 || 145 || 314 || 18.7 || 1.6 || 2.9 || 6.3 || align=center|
|-
|align="left"| || align="center"|C || align="left"|Wyoming || align="center"|1 || align="center"| || 3 || 3 || 2 || 0 || 2 || 1.0 || 0.7 || 0.0 || 0.7 || align=center|
|-
|align="left"| || align="center"|G || align="left"|South Carolina || align="center"|3 || align="center"|– || 50 || 577 || 54 || 46 || 179 || 11.5 || 1.1 || 0.9 || 3.6 || align=center|
|-
|align="left"| || align="center"|G/F || align="left"|UCLA || align="center"|2 || align="center"|– || 154 || 3,711 || 762 || 386 || 1,535 || 24.1 || 4.9 || 2.5 || 10.0 || align=center|
|-
|align="left"| || align="center"|G || align="left"|Oakland || align="center"|1 || align="center"| || 14 || 134 || 14 || 20 || 55 || 9.6 || 1.0 || 1.4 || 3.9 || align=center|
|-
|align="left" bgcolor="#CCFFCC"|x || align="center"|F/C || align="left"|Brazil || align="center"|4 || align="center"|– || 212 || 3,084 || 864 || 158 || 969 || 14.5 || 4.1 || 0.7 || 4.6 || align=center|
|-
|align="left"| || align="center"|F/C || align="left"|San Francisco || align="center"|2 || align="center"|– || 38 || 320 || 85 || 25 || 106 || 8.4 || 2.2 || 0.7 || 2.8 || align=center|
|-
|align="left"| || align="center"|F || align="left"|Iowa State || align="center"|4 || align="center"|– || 232 || 5,090 || 1,158 || 287 || 2,426 || 21.9 || 5.0 || 1.2 || 10.5 || align=center|
|-
|align="left"| || align="center"|F/C || align="left"|UTEP || align="center"|1 || align="center"| || 17 || 299 || 54 || 16 || 104 || 17.6 || 3.2 || 0.9 || 6.1 || align=center|
|-
|align="left"| || align="center"|F/C || align="left"|South Carolina || align="center"|2 || align="center"|– || 92 || 1,761 || 652 || 202 || 859 || 19.1 || 7.1 || 2.2 || 9.3 || align=center|
|-
|align="left"| || align="center"|G || align="left"|BYU || align="center"|1 || align="center"| || 8 || 56 || 7 || 3 || 32 || 7.0 || 0.9 || 0.4 || 4.0 || align=center|
|-
|align="left"| || align="center"|F || align="left"|Ohio State || align="center"|1 || align="center"| || 2 || 21 || 3 || 0 || 9 || 10.5 || 1.5 || 0.0 || 4.5 || align=center|
|-
|align="left"| || align="center"|G || align="left"|Missouri || align="center"|1 || align="center"| || 4 || 45 || 4 || 1 || 21 || 11.3 || 1.0 || 0.3 || 5.3 || align=center|
|-
|align="left"| || align="center"|F || align="left"|Florida State || align="center"|4 || align="center"|– || 160 || 2,091 || 453 || 69 || 967 || 13.1 || 2.8 || 0.4 || 6.0 || align=center|
|-
|align="left" bgcolor="#FFCC00"|+ || align="center"|F/C || align="left"|Spain || align="center"|2 || align="center"|– || 150 || 4,972 || 1,712 || 504 || 2,633 || 33.1 || 11.4 || 3.4 || 17.6 || align=center|
|-
|align="left" bgcolor="#FFFF99"|^ || align="center"|G/F || align="left"|Eastern Michigan || align="center"|1 || align="center"| || 82 || 2,065 || 215 || 144 || 1,325 || 25.2 || 2.6 || 1.8 || 16.2 || align=center|
|-
|align="left"| || align="center"|F || align="left"|USC || align="center"|8 || align="center"|– || 562 || 14,170 || 3,586 || 564 || 5,280 || 25.2 || 6.4 || 1.0 || 9.4 || align=center|
|-
|align="left"| || align="center"|G || align="left"|Illinois || align="center"|1 || align="center"| || 56 || 1,411 || 190 || 89 || 539 || 25.2 || 3.4 || 1.6 || 9.6 || align=center|
|-
|align="left" bgcolor="#FFFF99"|^ || align="center"|C || align="left"|Jacksonville || align="center"|7 || align="center"|– || 482 || 16,777 || 5,342 || 1,186 || 9,288 || 34.8 || 11.1 || 2.5 || 19.3 || align=center|
|-
|align="left"| || align="center"|F || align="left"|Kansas || align="center"|2 || align="center"|– || 49 || 1,476 || 433 || 74 || 658 || 30.1 || 8.8 || 1.5 || 13.4 || align=center|
|-
|align="left"| || align="center"|F || align="left"|Princeton || align="center"|1 || align="center"| || 12 || 133 || 21 || 6 || 19 || 11.1 || 1.8 || 0.5 || 1.6 || align=center|
|-
|align="left"| || align="center"|G || align="left"|UConn || align="center"|5 || align="center"|– || 398 || 12,478 || 1,196 || 1,192 || 7,372 || 31.4 || 3.0 || 3.0 || 18.5 || align=center|
|-
|align="left"| || align="center"|G || align="left"|Oklahoma State || align="center"|1 || align="center"| || 3 || 20 || 3 || 1 || 5 || 6.7 || 1.0 || 0.3 || 1.7 || align=center|
|-
|align="left" bgcolor="#FFCC00"|+ || align="center"|F/C || align="left"|Clemson || align="center"|7 || align="center"|– || 546 || 18,204 || 4,721 || 1,316 || 6,866 || 33.3 || 8.6 || 2.4 || 12.6 || align=center|
|-
|align="left"| || align="center"|G || align="left"|Notre Dame || align="center"|2 || align="center"|– || 137 || 2,714 || 283 || 463 || 989 || 19.8 || 2.1 || 3.4 || 7.2 || align=center|
|-
|align="left"| || align="center"|C || align="left"|Pittsburgh || align="center"|3 || align="center"|– || 125 || 1,378 || 404 || 89 || 476 || 11.0 || 3.2 || 0.7 || 3.8 || align=center|
|-
|align="left"| || align="center"|F/C || align="left"|UNLV || align="center"|3 || align="center"|– || 177 || 3,714 || 1,078 || 193 || 1,626 || 21.0 || 6.1 || 1.1 || 9.2 || align=center|
|-
|align="left"| || align="center"|F/C || align="left"|UCLA || align="center"|6 || align="center"|– || 464 || 15,011 || 4,222 || 1,030 || 5,824 || 32.4 || 9.1 || 2.2 || 12.6 || align=center|
|-
|align="left"| || align="center"|G/F || align="left"|Seton Hall || align="center"|3 || align="center"|– || 145 || 1,474 || 292 || 134 || 339 || 10.2 || 2.0 || 0.9 || 2.3 || align=center|
|-
|align="left"| || align="center"|G/F || align="left"|Saint Joseph's || align="center"|3 || align="center"|– || 178 || 4,575 || 312 || 548 || 1,182 || 25.7 || 1.8 || 3.1 || 6.6 || align=center|
|-
|align="left"| || align="center"|G || align="left"|Indiana || align="center"|2 || align="center"|– || 78 || 1,237 || 80 || 145 || 442 || 15.9 || 1.0 || 1.9 || 5.7 || align=center|
|}

H

|-
|align="left"| || align="center"|F/C || align="left"|UCLA || align="center"|3 || align="center"|– || 63 || 354 || 91 || 14 || 140 || 5.6 || 1.4 || 0.2 || 2.2 || align=center|
|-
|align="left"| || align="center"|G/F || align="left"|Utah State || align="center"|2 || align="center"|– || 40 || 540 || 70 || 73 || 243 || 13.5 || 1.8 || 1.8 || 6.1 || align=center|
|-
|align="left"| || align="center"|G/F || align="left"|UConn || align="center"|2 || align="center"|– || 78 || 1,785 || 149 || 203 || 816 || 22.9 || 1.9 || 2.6 || 10.5 || align=center|
|-
|align="left"| || align="center"|G || align="left"|Iowa || align="center"|1 || align="center"| || 66 || 769 || 73 || 68 || 165 || 11.7 || 1.1 || 1.0 || 2.5 || align=center|
|-
|align="left"| || align="center"|G || align="left"|LSU || align="center"|1 || align="center"| || 2 || 4 || 0 || 0 || 0 || 2.0 || 0.0 || 0.0 || 0.0 || align=center|
|-
|align="left"| || align="center"|C || align="left"|Martin Luther King HS (MI) || align="center"|1 || align="center"| || 14 || 305 || 94 || 18 || 65 || 21.8 || 6.7 || 1.3 || 4.6 || align=center|
|-
|align="left"| || align="center"|G/F || align="left"|Miami (OH) || align="center"|5 || align="center"|– || 350 || 8,553 || 1,056 || 912 || 2,760 || 24.4 || 3.0 || 2.6 || 7.9 || align=center|
|-
|align="left"| || align="center"|F/C || align="left"|Georgetown || align="center"|2 || align="center"|– || 142 || 2,095 || 446 || 95 || 908 || 14.8 || 3.1 || 0.7 || 6.4 || align=center|
|-
|align="left" bgcolor="#CCFFCC"|x || align="center"|G || align="left"|Tulsa || align="center"|1 || align="center"| || 73 || 1,430 || 222 || 139 || 474 || 19.6 || 3.0 || 1.9 || 6.5 || align=center|
|-
|align="left"| || align="center"|G || align="left"|Western Kentucky || align="center"|3 || align="center"|– || 237 || 7,565 || 964 || 1,095 || 3,703 || 31.9 || 4.1 || 4.6 || 15.6 || align=center|
|-
|align="left"| || align="center"|G || align="left"|Austin Peay || align="center"|2 || align="center"|– || 160 || 4,236 || 510 || 323 || 1,023 || 26.5 || 3.2 || 2.0 || 6.4 || align=center|
|-
|align="left"| || align="center"|G || align="left"|Bradley || align="center"|1 || align="center"| || 61 || 1,622 || 175 || 134 || 480 || 26.6 || 2.9 || 2.2 || 7.9 || align=center|
|-
|align="left"| || align="center"|F || align="left"|Oklahoma || align="center"|1 || align="center"| || 78 || 1,535 || 447 || 58 || 807 || 19.7 || 5.7 || 0.7 || 10.3 || align=center|
|-
|align="left"| || align="center"|F || align="left"|USC || align="center"|1 || align="center"| || 18 || 467 || 116 || 24 || 126 || 25.9 || 6.4 || 1.3 || 7.0 || align=center|
|-
|align="left"| || align="center"|F || align="left"|Tulane || align="center"|1 || align="center"| || 35 || 255 || 65 || 23 || 93 || 7.3 || 1.9 || 0.7 || 2.7 || align=center|
|-
|align="left"| || align="center"|F || align="left"|Fresno State || align="center"|4 || align="center"|– || 233 || 4,796 || 726 || 369 || 1,679 || 20.6 || 3.1 || 1.6 || 7.2 || align=center|
|-
|align="left"| || align="center"|G || align="left"|Kansas || align="center"|11 || align="center"|–– || 748 || 23,545 || 2,281 || 3,811 || 8,536 || 31.5 || 3.0 || 5.1 || 11.4 || align=center|
|-
|align="left"| || align="center"|G || align="left"|Long Beach State || align="center"|4 || align="center"|– || 241 || 3,565 || 203 || 399 || 1,497 || 14.8 || 0.8 || 1.7 || 6.2 || align=center|
|-
|align="left"| || align="center"|G || align="left"|Iowa State || align="center"|4 || align="center"|– || 247 || 5,284 || 765 || 554 || 1,441 || 21.4 || 3.1 || 2.2 || 5.8 || align=center|
|-
|align="left"| || align="center"|F || align="left"|San Diego State || align="center"|1 || align="center"| || 4 || 11 || 1 || 0 || 2 || 2.8 || 0.3 || 0.0 || 0.5 || align=center|
|-
|align="left"| || align="center"|F || align="left"|Washington || align="center"|3 || align="center"|– || 137 || 4,100 || 523 || 283 || 1,492 || 29.9 || 3.8 || 2.1 || 10.9 || align=center|
|-
|align="left"| || align="center"|G || align="left"|New Orleans || align="center"|3 || align="center"|– || 243 || 7,820 || 801 || 896 || 3,568 || 32.2 || 3.3 || 3.7 || 14.7 || align=center|
|-
|align="left"| || align="center"|F || align="left"|Jackson State || align="center"|1 || align="center"| || 6 || 14 || 4 || 0 || 4 || 2.3 || 0.7 || 0.0 || 0.7 || align=center|
|-
|align="left"| || align="center"|G || align="left"|UCLA || align="center"|1 || align="center"| || 24 || 447 || 30 || 48 || 171 || 18.6 || 1.3 || 2.0 || 7.1 || align=center|
|-
|align="left"| || align="center"|G/F || align="left"|Ohio State || align="center"|2 || align="center"|– || 63 || 738 || 109 || 65 || 266 || 11.7 || 1.7 || 1.0 || 4.2 || align=center|
|-
|align="left"| || align="center"|G || align="left"|Saint Louis || align="center"|2 || align="center"|– || 58 || 1,602 || 181 || 146 || 697 || 27.6 || 3.1 || 2.5 || 12.0 || align=center|
|-
|align="left"| || align="center"|F/C || align="left"|Princeton || align="center"|1 || align="center"| || 18 || 186 || 37 || 13 || 60 || 10.3 || 2.1 || 0.7 || 3.3 || align=center|
|-
|align="left"| || align="center"|G || align="left"|Jackson State || align="center"|2 || align="center"|– || 41 || 388 || 26 || 46 || 86 || 9.5 || 0.6 || 1.1 || 2.1 || align=center|
|-
|align="left"| || align="center"|G || align="left"|Georgia State || align="center"|1 || align="center"| || 3 || 9 || 1 || 0 || 0 || 3.0 || 0.3 || 0.0 || 0.0 || align=center|
|-
|align="left" bgcolor="#CCFFCC"|x || align="center"|G || align="left"|Boise State || align="center"|1 || align="center"| || 44 || 895 || 185 || 34 || 229 || 20.3 || 4.2 || 0.8 || 5.2 || align=center|
|}

J to K

|-
|align="left"| || align="center"|G/F || align="left"|Notre Dame || align="center"|2 || align="center"|– || 116 || 1,721 || 230 || 127 || 662 || 14.8 || 2.0 || 1.1 || 5.7 || align=center|
|-
|align="left"| || align="center"|G || align="left"|Duquesne || align="center"|2 || align="center"| || 22 || 197 || 17 || 46 || 64 || 9.0 || 0.8 || 2.1 || 2.9 || align=center|
|-
|align="left"| || align="center"|G/F || align="left"|Fresno State || align="center"|1 || align="center"| || 19 || 187 || 28 || 6 || 76 || 9.8 || 1.5 || 0.3 || 4.0 || align=center|
|-
|align="left"| || align="center"|G/F || align="left"|Syracuse || align="center"|1 || align="center"| || 17 || 119 || 16 || 4 || 47 || 7.0 || 0.9 || 0.2 || 2.8 || align=center|
|-
|align="left"| || align="center"|F || align="left"|Wake Forest || align="center"|2 || align="center"|– || 78 || 880 || 152 || 62 || 298 || 11.3 || 1.9 || 0.8 || 3.8 || align=center|
|-
|align="left"| || align="center"|F || align="left"|Tulane || align="center"|2 || align="center"| || 49 || 776 || 191 || 29 || 182 || 15.8 || 3.9 || 0.6 || 3.7 || align=center|
|-
|align="left"| || align="center"|F || align="left"|Aurora || align="center"|5 || align="center"|– || 363 || 10,992 || 3,045 || 992 || 5,531 || 30.3 || 8.4 || 2.7 || 15.2 || align=center|
|-
|align="left"| || align="center"|F || align="left"|Temple || align="center"|2 || align="center"|– || 150 || 3,269 || 390 || 324 || 1,257 || 21.8 || 2.6 || 2.2 || 8.4 || align=center|
|-
|align="left"| || align="center"|F/C || align="left"|Oregon State || align="center"|2 || align="center"|– || 105 || 2,253 || 603 || 82 || 1,033 || 21.5 || 5.7 || 0.8 || 9.8 || align=center|
|-
|align="left"| || align="center"|G/F || align="left"|UNLV || align="center"|1 || align="center"| || 8 || 65 || 8 || 4 || 12 || 8.1 || 1.0 || 0.5 || 1.5 || align=center|
|-
|align="left"| || align="center"|F/C || align="left"|Albany State || align="center"|1 || align="center"| || 42 || 885 || 211 || 34 || 142 || 21.1 || 5.0 || 0.8 || 3.4 || align=center|
|-
|align="left"| || align="center"|F/C || align="left"|Albany State || align="center"|1 || align="center"| || 3 || 29 || 6 || 1 || 8 || 9.7 || 2.0 || 0.3 || 2.7 || align=center|
|-
|align="left"| || align="center"|G || align="left"|LIU Brooklyn || align="center"|1 || align="center"| || 29 || 476 || 42 || 41 || 108 || 16.4 || 1.4 || 1.4 || 3.7 || align=center|
|-
|align="left"| || align="center"|F/C || align="left"|Houston || align="center"|4 || align="center"|– || 261 || 5,457 || 1,399 || 343 || 2,146 || 20.9 || 5.4 || 1.3 || 8.2 || align=center|
|-
|align="left" bgcolor="#FFFF99"|^ (#23) || align="center"|G/F || align="left"|North Carolina || align="center" bgcolor="#CFECEC"|13 || align="center"|–– || bgcolor="#CFECEC"|930 || bgcolor="#CFECEC"|35,887 || bgcolor="#CFECEC"|5,836 || bgcolor="#CFECEC"|5,012 || bgcolor="#CFECEC"|29,277 || 38.6 || 6.3 || 5.4 || bgcolor="#CFECEC"|31.5 || align=center|
|-
|align="left"| || align="center"|F/C || align="left"|Guilford || align="center"|1 || align="center"| || 64 || 775 || 211 || 76 || 276 || 12.1 || 3.3 || 1.2 || 4.3 || align=center|
|-
|align="left"| || align="center"|F || align="left"|Memphis || align="center"|3 || align="center"|– || 142 || 3,222 || 582 || 185 || 1,526 || 22.7 || 4.1 || 1.3 || 10.7 || align=center|
|-
|align="left"| || align="center"|G || align="left"|Arizona || align="center"|5 || align="center"|– || 378 || 8,774 || 567 || 824 || 3,109 || 23.2 || 1.5 || 2.2 || 8.2 || align=center|
|-
|align="left"| || align="center"|F/C || align="left"|UMass || align="center"|1 || align="center"| || 6 || 41 || 7 || 1 || 10 || 6.8 || 1.2 || 0.2 || 1.7 || align=center|
|-
|align="left"| || align="center"|F || align="left"|Russia || align="center"|2 || align="center"|– || 42 || 336 || 77 || 29 || 105 || 8.0 || 1.8 || 0.7 || 2.5 || align=center|
|-
|align="left"| || align="center"|G || align="left"|Cincinnati || align="center"|1 || align="center"| || 9 || 214 || 25 || 13 || 139 || 23.8 || 2.8 || 1.4 || 15.4 || align=center|
|-
|align="left"| || align="center"|G || align="left"|Tulsa || align="center"|3 || align="center"|– || 193 || 2,444 || 225 || 260 || 953 || 12.7 || 1.2 || 1.3 || 4.9 || align=center|
|-
|align="left"| || align="center"|F/C || align="left"|Oklahoma || align="center"|5 || align="center"|– || 344 || 5,839 || 1,136 || 339 || 2,278 || 17.0 || 3.3 || 1.0 || 6.6 || align=center|
|-
|align="left"| || align="center"|C || align="left"|Arkansas || align="center"|1 || align="center"| || 46 || 397 || 77 || 30 || 93 || 8.6 || 1.7 || 0.7 || 2.0 || align=center|
|-
|align="left"| || align="center"|F || align="left"|Marquette || align="center"|1 || align="center"| || 78 || 1,655 || 479 || 70 || 792 || 21.2 || 6.1 || 0.9 || 10.2 || align=center|
|-
|align="left"| || align="center"|G/F || align="left"|Creighton || align="center"|2 || align="center"|– || 147 || 3,118 || 309 || 236 || 1,210 || 21.2 || 2.1 || 1.6 || 8.2 || align=center|
|-
|align="left"| || align="center"|G || align="left"|Nebraska-Kearney || align="center"|1 || align="center"| || 53 || 480 || 47 || 39 || 174 || 9.1 || 0.9 || 0.7 || 3.3 || align=center|
|-
|align="left"| || align="center"|F/C || align="left"|Montana || align="center"|1 || align="center"| || 19 || 287 || 59 || 26 || 83 || 15.1 || 3.1 || 1.4 || 4.4 || align=center|
|-
|align="left"| || align="center"|F || align="left"|Croatia || align="center"|7 || align="center"|– || 436 || 12,862 || 2,088 || 1,840 || 6,148 || 29.5 || 4.8 || 4.2 || 14.1 || align=center|
|}

L to M

|-
|align="left"| || align="center"|F/C || align="left"|Arizona State || align="center"|3 || align="center"|– || 196 || 4,021 || 1,493 || 141 || 1,445 || 20.5 || 7.6 || 0.7 || 7.4 || align=center|
|-
|align="left"| || align="center"|C || align="left"|Arkansas || align="center"|1 || align="center"| || 21 || 386 || 93 || 13 || 80 || 18.4 || 4.4 || 0.6 || 3.8 || align=center|
|-
|align="left"| || align="center"|G || align="left"|Wake Forest || align="center"|3 || align="center"|– || 61 || 1,001 || 74 || 79 || 289 || 16.4 || 1.2 || 1.3 || 4.7 || align=center|
|-
|align="left"| || align="center"|G || align="left"|Indiana || align="center"|2 || align="center"|– || 118 || 2,132 || 282 || 99 || 832 || 18.1 || 2.4 || 0.8 || 7.1 || align=center|
|-
|align="left"| || align="center"|F/C || align="left"|France || align="center"|1 || align="center"| || 20 || 241 || 68 || 19 || 89 || 12.1 || 3.4 || 1.0 || 4.5 || align=center|
|-
|align="left" bgcolor="#CCFFCC"|x || align="center"|G || align="left"|UCLA || align="center"|2 || align="center"|– || 87 || 2,827 || 388 || 355 || 1,893 || 32.5 || 4.5 || 4.1 || 21.8 || align=center|
|-
|align="left"| || align="center"|G || align="left"|Texas A&M || align="center"|1 || align="center"| || 12 || 135 || 14 || 16 || 66 || 11.3 || 1.2 || 1.3 || 5.5 || align=center|
|-
|align="left"| || align="center"|G || align="left"|Bradley || align="center"|1 || align="center"| || 6 || 167 || 27 || 30 || 86 || 27.8 || 4.5 || 5.0 || 14.3 || align=center|
|-
|align="left"| || align="center"|G || align="left"|Iowa || align="center"|4 || align="center"|– || 191 || 4,459 || 437 || 869 || 1,660 || 23.3 || 2.3 || 4.5 || 8.7 || align=center|
|-
|align="left"| || align="center"|G || align="left"|Florida || align="center"|1 || align="center"| || 4 || 28 || 0 || 1 || 4 || 7.0 || 0.0 || 0.3 || 1.0 || align=center|
|-
|align="left"| || align="center"|F || align="left"|Wichita State || align="center"|2 || align="center"|– || 157 || 2,033 || 452 || 122 || 625 || 12.9 || 2.9 || 0.8 || 4.0 || align=center|
|-
|align="left"| || align="center"|G || align="left"|LSU || align="center"|1 || align="center"| || 5 || 22 || 4 || 1 || 0 || 4.4 || 0.8 || 0.2 || 0.0 || align=center|
|-
|align="left"| || align="center"|F/C || align="left"|Arizona State || align="center"|1 || align="center"| || 67 || 465 || 93 || 32 || 111 || 6.9 || 1.4 || 0.5 || 1.7 || align=center|
|-
|align="left"| || align="center"|C || align="left"|New Mexico || align="center"|5 || align="center"|– || 261 || 6,330 || 1,392 || 557 || 2,326 || 24.3 || 5.3 || 2.1 || 8.9 || align=center|
|-
|align="left"| || align="center"|C || align="left"|Stanford || align="center"|3 || align="center"|– || 219 || 5,567 || 1,096 || 293 || 2,299 || 25.4 || 5.0 || 1.3 || 10.5 || align=center|
|-
|align="left" bgcolor="#FFCC00"|+ (#10) || align="center"|F || align="left"|Southern || align="center"|9 || align="center"|– || 592 || 22,073 || 3,998 || 991 || 12,623 || 37.3 || 6.8 || 1.7 || 21.3 || align=center|
|-
|align="left"| || align="center"|G || align="left"|Oklahoma State || align="center"|2 || align="center"|– || 51 || 736 || 76 || 109 || 371 || 14.4 || 1.5 || 2.1 || 7.3 || align=center|
|-
|align="left"| || align="center"|F || align="left"|France || align="center"|1 || align="center"| || 29 || 546 || 79 || 22 || 196 || 18.8 || 2.7 || 0.8 || 6.8 || align=center|
|-
|align="left"| || align="center"|G || align="left"|East Carolina || align="center"|2 || align="center"|– || 26 || 542 || 50 || 34 || 186 || 20.8 || 1.9 || 1.3 || 7.2 || align=center|
|-
|align="left"| || align="center"|G || align="left"|Kentucky || align="center"|1 || align="center"| || 82 || 2,426 || 178 || 446 || 703 || 29.6 || 2.2 || 5.4 || 8.6 || align=center|
|-
|align="left"| || align="center"|G || align="left"|Penn || align="center"|1 || align="center"| || 51 || 1,175 || 64 || 138 || 327 || 23.0 || 1.3 || 2.7 || 6.4 || align=center|
|-
|align="left"| || align="center"|F || align="left"|Jackson State || align="center"|1 || align="center"| || 38 || 616 || 197 || 34 || 211 || 16.2 || 5.2 || 0.9 || 5.6 || align=center|
|-
|align="left"| || align="center"|G/F || align="left"|Duke || align="center"|2 || align="center"|– || 121 || 2,500 || 303 || 180 || 1,103 || 20.7 || 2.5 || 1.5 || 9.1 || align=center|
|-
|align="left" bgcolor="#CCFFCC"|x || align="center"|F/C || align="left"|Arizona || align="center"|2 || align="center"|– || 120 || 3,702 || 978 || 154 || 2,007 || 30.9 || 8.2 || 1.3 || 16.7 || align=center|
|-
|align="left"| || align="center"|F || align="left"|UConn || align="center"|2 || align="center"|– || 94 || 2,786 || 798 || 165 || 1,181 || 29.6 || 8.5 || 1.8 || 12.6 || align=center|
|-
|align="left"| || align="center"|F || align="left"|Kansas State || align="center"|1 || align="center"| || 6 || 48 || 5 || 2 || 15 || 8.0 || 0.8 || 0.3 || 2.5 || align=center|
|-
|align="left"| || align="center"|G || align="left"|Virginia || align="center"|2 || align="center"|– || 20 || 156 || 15 || 15 || 33 || 7.8 || 0.8 || 0.8 || 1.7 || align=center|
|-
|align="left"| || align="center"|G || align="left"|Wisconsin || align="center"|1 || align="center"| || 78 || 1,523 || 67 || 354 || 443 || 19.5 || 0.9 || 4.5 || 5.7 || align=center|
|-
|align="left"| || align="center"|F || align="left"|Indiana || align="center"|5 || align="center"|– || 281 || 6,687 || 1,206 || 465 || 3,048 || 23.8 || 4.3 || 1.7 || 10.8 || align=center|
|-
|align="left"| || align="center"|G || align="left"|Cal State Northridge || align="center"|1 || align="center"| || 9 || 119 || 16 || 14 || 47 || 13.2 || 1.8 || 1.6 || 5.2 || align=center|
|-
|align="left"| || align="center"|G/F || align="left"|Louisville || align="center"|1 || align="center"| || 64 || 1,019 || 158 || 81 || 222 || 15.9 || 2.5 || 1.3 || 3.5 || align=center|
|-
|align="left"| || align="center"|F || align="left"|Creighton || align="center"|3 || align="center"|– || 161 || 3,260 || 368 || 110 || 1,320 || 20.2 || 2.3 || 0.7 || 8.2 || align=center|
|-
|align="left"| || align="center"|F || align="left"|Eastern Michigan || align="center"|2 || align="center"|– || 46 || 438 || 98 || 19 || 151 || 9.5 || 2.1 || 0.4 || 3.3 || align=center|
|-
|align="left"| || align="center"|G || align="left"|Northwestern || align="center"|1 || align="center"| || 9 || 83 || 5 || 13 || 22 || 9.2 || 0.6 || 1.4 || 2.4 || align=center|
|-
|align="left"| || align="center"|F/C || align="left"|Drake || align="center"|2 || align="center"|– || 155 || 3,482 || 804 || 192 || 1,689 || 22.5 || 5.2 || 1.2 || 10.9 || align=center|
|-
|align="left"| || align="center"|G || align="left"|Auburn || align="center"|4 || align="center"|– || 253 || 5,037 || 380 || 571 || 2,386 || 19.9 || 1.5 || 2.3 || 9.4 || align=center|
|-
|align="left"| || align="center"|G/F || align="left"|Kentucky || align="center"|2 || align="center"|– || 101 || 4,038 || 391 || 319 || 1,875 || bgcolor="#CFECEC"|40.0 || 3.9 || 3.2 || 18.6 || align=center|
|-
|align="left"| || align="center"|C || align="left"|Purdue || align="center"|4 || align="center"|–– || 214 || 5,521 || 1,420 || 448 || 2,150 || 25.8 || 6.6 || 2.1 || 10.0 || align=center|
|-
|align="left"| || align="center"|F || align="left"|Montenegro || align="center"|4 || align="center"|– || 243 || 5,601 || 1,309 || 311 || 2,774 || 23.0 || 5.4 || 1.3 || 11.4 || align=center|
|-
|align="left"| || align="center"|C || align="left"|Kentucky || align="center"|3 || align="center"|– || 166 || 1,383 || 408 || 49 || 317 || 8.3 || 2.5 || 0.3 || 1.9 || align=center|
|-
|align="left"| || align="center"|G/F || align="left"|Purdue || align="center"|2 || align="center"|– || 115 || 1,767 || 179 || 132 || 592 || 15.4 || 1.6 || 1.1 || 5.1 || align=center|
|-
|align="left"| || align="center"|G || align="left"|Georgia Tech || align="center"|1 || align="center"| || 9 || 87 || 2 || 6 || 41 || 9.7 || 0.2 || 0.7 || 4.6 || align=center|
|-
|align="left"| || align="center"|F/C || align="left"|San Francisco || align="center"|3 || align="center"|– || 167 || 3,823 || 857 || 331 || 1,439 || 22.9 || 5.1 || 2.0 || 8.6 || align=center|
|-
|align="left"| || align="center"|F || align="left"|Florida || align="center"|1 || align="center"| || 24 || 62 || 8 || 2 || 6 || 2.6 || 0.3 || 0.1 || 0.3 || align=center|
|-
|align="left"| || align="center"|G || align="left"|Shaw || align="center"|1 || align="center"| || 29 || 680 || 85 || 51 || 292 || 23.4 || 2.9 || 1.8 || 10.1 || align=center|
|-
|align="left"| || align="center"|G/F || align="left"|Little Rock || align="center"|3 || align="center"|– || 182 || 3,455 || 337 || 414 || 1,034 || 19.0 || 1.9 || 2.3 || 5.7 || align=center|
|}

N to P

|-
|align="left"| || align="center"|F || align="left"|Kansas State || align="center"|3 || align="center"|– || 70 || 676 || 177 || 36 || 138 || 9.7 || 2.5 || 0.5 || 2.0 || align=center|
|-
|align="left"| || align="center"|C || align="left"|NC State || align="center"|1 || align="center"| || 4 || 9 || 1 || 1 || 2 || 2.3 || 0.3 || 0.3 || 0.5 || align=center|
|-
|align="left"| || align="center"|C || align="left"|Columbia || align="center"|1 || align="center"| || 81 || 1,159 || 347 || 58 || 456 || 14.3 || 4.3 || 0.7 || 5.6 || align=center|
|-
|align="left"| || align="center"|F || align="left"|Syracuse || align="center"|2 || align="center"|– || 13 || 35 || 4 || 2 || 15 || 2.7 || 0.3 || 0.2 || 1.2 || align=center|
|-
|align="left" bgcolor="#FFCC00"|+ || align="center"|C || align="left"|Florida || align="center"|9 || align="center"|– || 572 || 16,848 || 5,387 || 1,704 || 5,325 || 29.5 || 9.4 || 3.0 || 9.3 || align=center|
|-
|align="left"| || align="center"|F || align="left"|Argentina || align="center"|5 || align="center"|– || 351 || 8,836 || 1,751 || 451 || 4,120 || 25.2 || 5.0 || 1.3 || 11.7 || align=center|
|-
|align="left"| || align="center"|G || align="left"|Cal Poly || align="center"|1 || align="center"| || 70 || 1,646 || 326 || 104 || 555 || 23.5 || 4.7 || 1.5 || 7.9 || align=center|
|-
|align="left"| || align="center"|F/C || align="left"|Virginia Union || align="center"|4 || align="center"|– || 298 || 8,951 || 3,147 || 791 || 3,162 || 30.0 || 10.6 || 2.7 || 10.6 || align=center|
|-
|align="left"| || align="center"|F || align="left"|Minnesota || align="center"|1 || align="center"| || 80 || 1,817 || 358 || 131 || 698 || 22.7 || 4.5 || 1.6 || 8.7 || align=center|
|-
|align="left"| || align="center"|C || align="left"|Seattle || align="center"|4 || align="center"|– || 195 || 3,310 || 822 || 106 || 932 || 17.0 || 4.2 || 0.5 || 4.8 || align=center|
|-
|align="left"| || align="center"|G || align="left"|UConn || align="center"|1 || align="center"| || 52 || 1,146 || 128 || 193 || 304 || 22.0 || 2.5 || 3.7 || 5.8 || align=center|
|-
|align="left"| || align="center"|G || align="left"|Arkansas || align="center"|4 || align="center"|– || 165 || 2,273 || 213 || 306 || 997 || 13.8 || 1.3 || 1.9 || 6.0 || align=center|
|-
|align="left" bgcolor="#FFFF99"|^ || align="center"|C || align="left"|Centenary || align="center"|1 || align="center"| || 43 || 406 || 89 || 22 || 161 || 9.4 || 2.1 || 0.5 || 3.7 || align=center|
|-
|align="left"| || align="center"|F || align="left"|Duke || align="center"|1 || align="center"| || 39 || 1,042 || 241 || 84 || 556 || 26.7 || 6.2 || 2.2 || 14.3 || align=center|
|-
|align="left"| || align="center"|C || align="left"|UCLA || align="center"|1 || align="center"| || 52 || 782 || 200 || 71 || 164 || 15.0 || 3.8 || 1.4 || 3.2 || align=center|
|-
|align="left"| || align="center"|F/C || align="left"|Northeastern State || align="center"|1 || align="center"| || 7 || 60 || 15 || 4 || 23 || 8.6 || 2.1 || 0.6 || 3.3 || align=center|
|-
|align="left"| || align="center"|G || align="left"|Notre Dame || align="center"|9 || align="center"|– || 645 || 15,540 || 805 || 2,394 || 4,932 || 24.1 || 1.2 || 3.7 || 7.6 || align=center|
|-
|align="left"| || align="center"|G || align="left"|Murray State || align="center"|3 || align="center"|– || 67 || 1,260 || 139 || 211 || 451 || 18.8 || 2.1 || 3.1 || 6.7 || align=center|
|-
|align="left"| || align="center"|C || align="left"|Vanderbilt || align="center"|8 || align="center"|– || 518 || 7,052 || 2,104 || 447 || 2,264 || 13.6 || 4.1 || 0.9 || 4.4 || align=center|
|-
|align="left"| || align="center"|G || align="left"|Oregon State || align="center"|2 || align="center"|– || 69 || 530 || 67 || 48 || 199 || 7.7 || 1.0 || 0.7 || 2.9 || align=center|
|-
|align="left"| || align="center"|G/F || align="left"|Nebraska || align="center"|2 || align="center"|– || 97 || 1,069 || 102 || 64 || 383 || 11.0 || 1.1 || 0.7 || 3.9 || align=center|
|-
|align="left" bgcolor="#FFFF99"|^ (#33) || align="center"|G/F || align="left"|Central Arkansas || align="center"|12 || align="center"|– || 856 || 30,269 || 5,726 || 4,494 || 15,123 || 35.4 || 6.7 || 5.3 || 17.7 || align=center|
|-
|align="left"| || align="center"|F/C || align="left"|Long Beach State || align="center"|3 || align="center"|– || 197 || 2,856 || 747 || 218 || 778 || 14.5 || 3.8 || 1.1 || 3.9 || align=center|
|-
|align="left"| || align="center"|G/F || align="left"|Washington || align="center"|1 || align="center"| || 23 || 196 || 27 || 9 || 45 || 8.5 || 1.2 || 0.4 || 2.0 || align=center|
|-
|align="left"| || align="center"|F/C || align="left"|Central Michigan || align="center"|1 || align="center"| || 21 || 167 || 24 || 7 || 51 || 8.0 || 1.1 || 0.3 || 2.4 || align=center|
|-
|align="left"| || align="center"|F/C || align="left"|Villanova || align="center"|3 || align="center"|– || 183 || 2,366 || 586 || 72 || 1,303 || 12.9 || 3.2 || 0.4 || 7.1 || align=center|
|-
|align="left" bgcolor="#CCFFCC"|x || align="center"|F || align="left"|Georgetown || align="center"|1 || align="center"| || 15 || 492 || 83 || 40 || 262 || 32.8 || 5.5 || 2.7 || 17.5 || align=center|
|-
|align="left"| || align="center"|F || align="left"|Arkansas || align="center"|4 || align="center"|– || 221 || 4,276 || 1,292 || 239 || 2,147 || 19.3 || 5.8 || 1.1 || 9.7 || align=center|
|-
|align="left"| || align="center"|G || align="left"|Boston College || align="center"|1 || align="center"| || 3 || 17 || 1 || 4 || 2 || 5.7 || 0.3 || 1.3 || 0.7 || align=center|
|}

R

|-
|align="left"| || align="center"|F || align="left"|Serbia || align="center"|1 || align="center"| || 25 || 144 || 28 || 8 || 33 || 5.8 || 1.1 || 0.3 || 1.3 || align=center|
|-
|align="left"| || align="center"|F || align="left"|Kansas || align="center"|1 || align="center"| || 15 || 67 || 9 || 7 || 26 || 4.5 || 0.6 || 0.5 || 1.7 || align=center|
|-
|align="left"| || align="center"|C || align="left"|Oklahoma || align="center"|3 || align="center"|– || 235 || 6,513 || 2,643 || 771 || 1,950 || 27.7 || 11.2 || 3.3 || 8.3 || align=center|
|-
|align="left"| || align="center"|G || align="left"|Arizona || align="center"|1 || align="center"| || 3 || 48 || 4 || 13 || 11 || 16.0 || 1.3 || 4.3 || 3.7 || align=center|
|-
|align="left"| || align="center"|C || align="left"|Iowa || align="center"|1 || align="center"| || 19 || 132 || 38 || 1 || 21 || 6.9 || 2.0 || 0.1 || 1.1 || align=center|
|-
|align="left"| || align="center"|F || align="left"|Florida || align="center"|1 || align="center"| || 18 || 224 || 59 || 7 || 37 || 12.4 || 3.3 || 0.4 || 2.1 || align=center|
|-
|align="left"| || align="center"|G || align="left"|Hofstra || align="center"|1 || align="center"| || 8 || 63 || 7 || 1 || 30 || 7.9 || 0.9 || 0.1 || 3.8 || align=center|
|-
|align="left"| || align="center"|G || align="left"|Florida || align="center"|1 || align="center"| || 6 || 23 || 7 || 1 || 12 || 3.8 || 1.2 || 0.2 || 2.0 || align=center|
|-
|align="left"| || align="center"|G/F || align="left"|Central Oklahoma || align="center"|3 || align="center"|– || 144 || 3,032 || 382 || 161 || 969 || 21.1 || 2.7 || 1.1 || 6.7 || align=center|
|-
|align="left"| || align="center"|G || align="left"|Wyoming || align="center"|2 || align="center"|– || 91 || 2,580 || 337 || 271 || 1,510 || 28.4 || 3.7 || 3.0 || 16.6 || align=center|
|-
|align="left"| || align="center"|F || align="left"|UNLV || align="center"|1 || align="center"| || 3 || 29 || 3 || 0 || 10 || 9.7 || 1.0 || 0.0 || 3.3 || align=center|
|-
|align="left"| || align="center"|G || align="left"|Washington || align="center"|1 || align="center"| || 82 || 2,086 || 184 || 358 || 1,074 || 25.4 || 2.2 || 4.4 || 13.1 || align=center|
|-
|align="left" bgcolor="#FFFF99"|^ || align="center"|G || align="left"|Temple || align="center"|2 || align="center"|– || 85 || 3,192 || 360 || 936 || 1,500 || 37.6 || 4.2 || bgcolor="#CFECEC"|11.0 || 17.6 || align=center|
|-
|align="left" bgcolor="#FFFF99"|^ || align="center"|F || align="left"|Southeastern Oklahoma State || align="center"|3 || align="center"|– || 199 || 6,891 || 3,036 || 560 || 1,037 || 34.6 || bgcolor="#CFECEC"|15.3 || 2.8 || 5.2 || align=center|
|-
|align="left"| || align="center"|G || align="left"|Kentucky || align="center"|1 || align="center"| || 69 || 1,843 || 355 || 461 || 538 || 26.7 || 5.1 || 6.7 || 7.8 || align=center|
|-
|align="left" bgcolor="#FFCC00"|+ || align="center"|G || align="left"|Memphis || align="center"|7 || align="center"|–– || 406 || 14,210 || 1,489 || 2,516 || 8,001 || 35.0 || 3.7 || 6.2 || 19.7 || align=center|
|-
|align="left"| || align="center"|G/F || align="left"|Michigan || align="center"|3 || align="center"|– || 128 || 5,096 || 539 || 609 || 2,742 || 39.8 || 4.2 || 4.8 || 21.4 || align=center|
|-
|align="left"| || align="center"|F || align="left"|Tulsa || align="center"|2 || align="center"|– || 116 || 1,854 || 512 || 83 || 278 || 16.0 || 4.4 || 0.7 || 2.4 || align=center|
|-
|align="left"| || align="center"|F/C || align="left"|BYU || align="center"|1 || align="center"| || 10 || 60 || 16 || 2 || 34 || 6.0 || 1.6 || 0.2 || 3.4 || align=center|
|-
|align="left"| || align="center"|G/F || align="left"|Michigan || align="center"|1 || align="center"| || 36 || 789 || 83 || 61 || 315 || 21.9 || 2.3 || 1.7 || 8.8 || align=center|
|-
|align="left"| || align="center"|G || align="left"|Detroit Mercy || align="center"|1 || align="center"| || 23 || 131 || 17 || 15 || 74 || 5.7 || 0.7 || 0.7 || 3.2 || align=center|
|}

S

|-
|align="left"| || align="center"|F/C || align="left"|Georgia Tech || align="center"|1 || align="center"| || 17 || 191 || 43 || 15 || 36 || 11.2 || 2.5 || 0.9 || 2.1 || align=center|
|-
|align="left"| || align="center"|G || align="left"|Miami (FL) || align="center"|2 || align="center"|– || 77 || 2,674 || 286 || 178 || 1,125 || 34.7 || 3.7 || 2.3 || 14.6 || align=center|
|-
|align="left"| || align="center"|G || align="left"|LSU || align="center"|1 || align="center"| || 14 || 214 || 16 || 10 || 71 || 15.3 || 1.1 || 0.7 || 5.1 || align=center|
|-
|align="left"| || align="center"|G/F || align="left"|St. John's || align="center"|1 || align="center"| || 4 || 127 || 32 || 4 || 80 || 31.8 || 8.0 || 1.0 || 20.0 || align=center|
|-
|align="left"| || align="center"|F || align="left"|Georgia Southern || align="center"|1 || align="center"| || 31 || 182 || 39 || 9 || 28 || 5.9 || 1.3 || 0.3 || 0.9 || align=center|
|-
|align="left"| || align="center"|F || align="left"|USC || align="center"|2 || align="center"|– || 46 || 210 || 29 || 21 || 52 || 4.6 || 0.6 || 0.5 || 1.1 || align=center|
|-
|align="left"| || align="center"|G || align="left"|Purdue || align="center"|2 || align="center"|– || 73 || 513 || 76 || 60 || 208 || 7.0 || 1.0 || 0.8 || 2.8 || align=center|
|-
|align="left"| || align="center"|C || align="left"|Georgia Tech || align="center"|1 || align="center"| || 20 || 149 || 29 || 7 || 36 || 7.5 || 1.5 || 0.4 || 1.8 || align=center|
|-
|align="left"| || align="center"|G/F || align="left"|Switzerland || align="center"|3 || align="center"|– || 183 || 3,039 || 531 || 254 || 914 || 16.6 || 2.9 || 1.4 || 5.0 || align=center|
|-
|align="left"| || align="center"|G/F || align="left"|Kansas || align="center"|1 || align="center"| || 43 || 984 || 136 || 73 || 342 || 22.9 || 3.2 || 1.7 || 8.0 || align=center|
|-
|align="left"| || align="center"|F/C || align="left"|Ohio State || align="center"|3 || align="center"|– || 242 || 5,695 || 850 || 342 || 2,008 || 23.5 || 3.5 || 1.4 || 8.3 || align=center|
|-
|align="left"| || align="center"|F || align="left"|Georgia || align="center"|1 || align="center"| || 9 || 17 || 2 || 2 || 4 || 1.9 || 0.2 || 0.2 || 0.4 || align=center|
|-
|align="left"| || align="center"|F || align="left"|Maryland || align="center"|2 || align="center"|– || 86 || 901 || 159 || 58 || 335 || 10.5 || 1.8 || 0.7 || 3.9 || align=center|
|-
|align="left"| || align="center"|F/C || align="left"|Iowa State || align="center"|1 || align="center"| || 7 || 86 || 16 || 4 || 21 || 12.3 || 2.3 || 0.6 || 3.0 || align=center|
|-
|align="left"| || align="center"|F || align="left"|NC State || align="center"|2 || align="center"|– || 18 || 80 || 15 || 2 || 32 || 4.4 || 0.8 || 0.1 || 1.8 || align=center|
|-
|align="left"| || align="center"|F || align="left"|Providence || align="center"|6 || align="center"|– || 307 || 5,002 || 1,141 || 288 || 1,334 || 16.3 || 3.7 || 0.9 || 4.3 || align=center|
|-
|align="left" bgcolor="#FFFF99"|^ (#4) || align="center"|G/F || align="left"|Evansville || align="center"|10 || align="center"|– || 696 || 24,798 || 5,385 || 1,815 || 10,233 || 35.6 || 7.7 || 2.6 || 14.7 || align=center|
|-
|align="left"| || align="center"|F || align="left"|Maryland || align="center"|1 || align="center"| || 50 || 1,146 || 265 || 47 || 559 || 22.9 || 5.3 || 0.9 || 11.2 || align=center|
|-
|align="left"| || align="center"|G || align="left"|UNLV || align="center"|1 || align="center"| || 30 || 496 || 54 || 42 || 259 || 16.5 || 1.8 || 1.4 || 8.6 || align=center|
|-
|align="left"| || align="center"|G || align="left"|Missouri || align="center"|1 || align="center"| || 2 || 11 || 0 || 0 || 0 || 5.5 || 0.0 || 0.0 || 0.0 || align=center|
|-
|align="left"| || align="center"|C || align="left"|Canisius || align="center"|1 || align="center"| || 38 || 408 || 110 || 19 || 108 || 10.7 || 2.9 || 0.5 || 2.8 || align=center|
|-
|align="left"| || align="center"|G/F || align="left"|New Mexico || align="center"|3 || align="center"|– || 213 || 3,944 || 499 || 193 || 1,119 || 18.5 || 2.3 || 0.9 || 5.3 || align=center|
|-
|align="left"| || align="center"|G || align="left"|UNLV || align="center"|3 || align="center"|– || 233 || 6,414 || 528 || 1,011 || 3,059 || 27.5 || 2.3 || 4.3 || 13.1 || align=center|
|-
|align="left"| || align="center"|F || align="left"|Wake Forest || align="center"|1 || align="center"| || 62 || 1,329 || 246 || 88 || 568 || 21.4 || 4.0 || 1.4 || 9.2 || align=center|
|-
|align="left"| || align="center"|G || align="left"|Villanova || align="center"|2 || align="center"| || 59 || 1,010 || 71 || 166 || 253 || 17.1 || 1.2 || 2.8 || 4.3 || align=center|
|-
|align="left"| || align="center"|C || align="left"|Tulane || align="center"|1 || align="center"| || 10 || 44 || 24 || 0 || 18 || 4.4 || 2.4 || 0.0 || 1.8 || align=center|
|-
|align="left"| || align="center"|F || align="left"|Howard || align="center"|1 || align="center"| || 9 || 39 || 9 || 3 || 21 || 4.3 || 1.0 || 0.3 || 2.3 || align=center|
|-
|align="left"| || align="center"|G || align="left"|Oklahoma State || align="center"|1 || align="center"| || 4 || 82 || 10 || 11 || 30 || 20.5 || 2.5 || 2.8 || 7.5 || align=center|
|-
|align="left"| || align="center"|G/F || align="left"|Pittsburgh || align="center"|1 || align="center"| || 17 || 65 || 10 || 6 || 14 || 3.8 || 0.6 || 0.4 || 0.8 || align=center|
|-
|align="left"| || align="center"|F || align="left"|Michigan State || align="center"|1 || align="center"| || 2 || 12 || 3 || 2 || 3 || 6.0 || 1.5 || 1.0 || 1.5 || align=center|
|-
|align="left"| || align="center"|F || align="left"|Georgetown || align="center"|2 || align="center"|– || 114 || 1,607 || 470 || 87 || 686 || 14.1 || 4.1 || 0.8 || 6.0 || align=center|
|}

T to V

|-
|align="left"| || align="center"|C || align="left"|Serbia || align="center"|1 || align="center"| || 43 || 598 || 122 || 31 || 103 || 13.9 || 2.8 || 0.7 || 2.4 || align=center|
|-
|align="left"| || align="center"|G || align="left"|Kentucky || align="center"|2 || align="center"|– || 67 || 634 || 63 || 91 || 144 || 9.5 || 0.9 || 1.4 || 2.1 || align=center|
|-
|align="left" bgcolor="#FFCC00"|+ || align="center"|G || align="left"|UNLV || align="center"|6 || align="center"|– || 441 || 14,897 || 1,502 || 2,472 || 8,279 || 33.8 || 3.4 || 5.6 || 18.8 || align=center|
|-
|align="left"| || align="center"|F || align="left"|Texas || align="center"|1 || align="center"| || 7 || 26 || 8 || 0 || 6 || 3.7 || 1.1 || 0.0 || 0.9 || align=center|
|-
|align="left"| || align="center"|F || align="left"|TCU || align="center"|1 || align="center"| || 52 || 1,178 || 301 || 60 || 211 || 22.7 || 5.8 || 1.2 || 4.1 || align=center|
|-
|align="left"| || align="center"|F || align="left"|San Diego State || align="center"|1 || align="center"| || 7 || 36 || 11 || 2 || 12 || 5.1 || 1.6 || 0.3 || 1.7 || align=center|
|-
|align="left"| || align="center"|F || align="left"|Villanova || align="center"|2 || align="center"| || 21 || 286 || 46 || 14 || 118 || 13.6 || 2.2 || 0.7 || 5.6 || align=center|
|-
|align="left"| || align="center"|F || align="left"|LSU || align="center"|4 || align="center"|– || 254 || 5,149 || 1,302 || 240 || 1,989 || 20.3 || 5.1 || 0.9 || 7.8 || align=center|
|-
|align="left"| || align="center"|G || align="left"|West Virginia Tech || align="center"|2 || align="center"|– || 85 || 1,479 || 106 || 284 || 613 || 17.4 || 1.2 || 3.3 || 7.2 || align=center|
|-
|align="left" bgcolor="#FFFF99"|^ || align="center"|F/C || align="left"|Bowling Green || align="center"|2 || align="center"|– || 93 || 3,016 || 975 || 354 || 680 || 32.4 || 10.5 || 3.8 || 7.3 || align=center|
|-
|align="left"| || align="center"|F || align="left"|Oklahoma Baptist || align="center"|1 || align="center"| || 33 || 557 || 113 || 31 || 231 || 16.9 || 3.4 || 0.9 || 7.0 || align=center|
|-
|align="left"| || align="center"|G || align="left"|Minnesota || align="center"|1 || align="center"| || 69 || 909 || 71 || 82 || 356 || 13.2 || 1.0 || 1.2 || 5.2 || align=center|
|-
|align="left"| || align="center"|G/F || align="left"|Ole Miss || align="center"|2 || align="center"|– || 87 || 1,034 || 125 || 111 || 265 || 11.9 || 1.4 || 1.3 || 3.0 || align=center|
|-
|align="left"| || align="center"|G || align="left"|Kentucky || align="center"|1 || align="center"| || 1 || 1 || 0 || 0 || 0 || 1.0 || 0.0 || 0.0 || 0.0 || align=center|
|-
|align="left" bgcolor="#CCFFCC"|x || align="center"|G || align="left"|Michigan State || align="center"|2 || align="center"|– || 134 || 3,071 || 544 || 307 || 1,074 || 22.9 || 4.1 || 2.3 || 8.0 || align=center|
|-
|align="left" bgcolor="#FFCC00"|+ || align="center"|G || align="left"|Saint Francis (PA) || align="center"|7 || align="center"|– || 535 || 19,122 || 2,506 || 3,676 || 6,505 || 35.7 || 4.7 || 6.9 || 12.2 || align=center|
|-
|align="left"| || align="center"|F || align="left"|Mississippi State || align="center"|1 || align="center"| || 1 || 2 || 0 || 0 || 0 || 2.0 || 0.0 || 0.0 || 0.0 || align=center|
|-
|align="left"| || align="center"|F || align="left"|Memphis || align="center"|1 || align="center"| || 3 || 6 || 1 || 0 || 4 || 2.0 || 0.3 || 0.0 || 1.3 || align=center|
|-
|align="left"| || align="center"|G || align="left"|Michigan State || align="center"|2 || align="center"|– || 99 || 2,656 || 293 || 579 || 1,034 || 26.8 || 3.0 || 5.8 || 10.4 || align=center|
|-
|align="left"| || align="center"|F || align="left"|Indiana || align="center"|1 || align="center"| || 21 || 399 || 144 || 21 || 145 || 19.0 || 6.9 || 1.0 || 6.9 || align=center|
|-
|align="left"| || align="center"|C || align="left"|UConn || align="center"|1 || align="center"| || 16 || 143 || 34 || 5 || 30 || 8.9 || 2.1 || 0.3 || 1.9 || align=center|
|}

W to Z

|-
|align="left"| || align="center"|G || align="left"|Marquette || align="center"|1 || align="center"| || 60 || 1,792 || 270 || 228 || 1,096 || 29.9 || 4.5 || 3.8 || 18.3 || align=center|
|-
|align="left"| || align="center"|C || align="left"|Ohio State || align="center"|2 || align="center"|– || 66 || 648 || 115 || 23 || 103 || 9.8 || 1.7 || 0.3 || 1.6 || align=center|
|-
|align="left"| || align="center"|G || align="left"|Loyola (IL) || align="center"|1 || align="center"| || 2 || 8 || 0 || 1 || 0 || 4.0 || 0.0 || 0.5 || 0.0 || align=center|
|-
|align="left" bgcolor="#FFFF99"|^ || align="center"|G/F || align="left"|Bradley || align="center"|6 || align="center"|– || 474 || 15,809 || 2,898 || 1,097 || 9,788 || 33.4 || 6.1 || 2.3 || 20.6 || align=center|
|-
|align="left"| || align="center"|G || align="left"|Arkansas || align="center"|1 || align="center"| || 28 || 367 || 39 || 44 || 72 || 13.1 || 1.4 || 1.6 || 2.6 || align=center|
|-
|align="left"| || align="center"|F/C || align="left"|Virginia Union || align="center"|2 || align="center"|– || 127 || 4,324 || 1,262 || 278 || 749 || 34.0 || 9.9 || 2.2 || 5.9 || align=center|
|-
|align="left"| || align="center"|G || align="left"|Boston College || align="center"|1 || align="center"| || 76 || 1,042 || 179 || 130 || 321 || 13.7 || 2.4 || 1.7 || 4.2 || align=center|
|-
|align="left"| || align="center"|F || align="left"|Syracuse || align="center"|1 || align="center"| || 28 || 533 || 102 || 17 || 243 || 19.0 || 3.6 || 0.6 || 8.7 || align=center|
|-
|align="left"| || align="center"|F/C || align="left"|Villanova || align="center"|3 || align="center"|– || 239 || 6,705 || 2,140 || 273 || 2,736 || 28.1 || 9.0 || 1.1 || 11.4 || align=center|
|-
|align="left"| || align="center"|G || align="left"|Tennessee || align="center"|2 || align="center"|– || 131 || 2,250 || 199 || 386 || 879 || 17.2 || 1.5 || 2.9 || 6.7 || align=center|
|-
|align="left"| || align="center"|F || align="left"|Illinois || align="center"|1 || align="center"| || 41 || 611 || 125 || 32 || 209 || 14.9 || 3.0 || 0.8 || 5.1 || align=center|
|-
|align="left"| || align="center"|G || align="left"|Penn State || align="center"|6 || align="center"|– || 469 || 12,261 || 972 || 2,008 || 4,445 || 26.1 || 2.1 || 4.3 || 9.5 || align=center|
|-
|align="left"| || align="center"|C || align="left"|St. John's || align="center"|6 || align="center"|– || 367 || 5,093 || 1,005 || 234 || 1,871 || 13.9 || 2.7 || 0.6 || 5.1 || align=center|
|-
|align="left"| || align="center"|C || align="left"|Kansas || align="center"|1 || align="center"| || 72 || 1,407 || 455 || 68 || 685 || 19.5 || 6.3 || 0.9 || 9.5 || align=center|
|-
|align="left"| || align="center"|G || align="left"|Alabama || align="center"|2 || align="center"|– || 150 || 3,544 || 298 || 1,043 || 1,017 || 23.6 || 2.0 || 7.0 || 6.8 || align=center|
|-
|align="left"| || align="center"|G || align="left"|Tennessee || align="center"|1 || align="center"| || 2 || 2 || 0 || 0 || 0 || 1.0 || 0.0 || 0.0 || 0.0 || align=center|
|-
|align="left"| || align="center"|G || align="left"|Florida State || align="center"|1 || align="center"| || 82 || 2,123 || 328 || 187 || 1,018 || 25.9 || 4.0 || 2.3 || 12.4 || align=center|
|-
|align="left"| || align="center"|F || align="left"|Central State || align="center"|2 || align="center"|– || 7 || 40 || 13 || 3 || 18 || 5.7 || 1.9 || 0.4 || 2.6 || align=center|
|-
|align="left"| || align="center"|G/F || align="left"|Indiana || align="center"|1 || align="center"| || 80 || 2,238 || 282 || 272 || 798 || 28.0 || 3.5 || 3.4 || 10.0 || align=center|
|-
|align="left"| || align="center"|F || align="left"|UCLA || align="center"|2 || align="center"|– || 105 || 1,402 || 255 || 94 || 513 || 13.4 || 2.4 || 0.9 || 4.9 || align=center|
|-
|align="left"| || align="center"|F/C || align="left"|Arizona || align="center"|1 || align="center"| || 9 || 138 || 33 || 12 || 63 || 15.3 || 3.7 || 1.3 || 7.0 || align=center|
|-
|align="left"| || align="center"|G || align="left"|Oklahoma State || align="center"|1 || align="center"| || 35 || 242 || 31 || 23 || 81 || 6.9 || 0.9 || 0.7 || 2.3 || align=center|
|-
|align="left"| || align="center"|G || align="left"|Illinois || align="center"|1 || align="center"| || 9 || 71 || 6 || 11 || 6 || 7.9 || 0.7 || 1.2 || 0.7 || align=center|
|-
|align="left"| || align="center"|G || align="left"|Duke || align="center"|1 || align="center"| || 75 || 1,961 || 195 || 350 || 714 || 26.1 || 2.6 || 4.7 || 9.5 || align=center|
|-
|align="left"| || align="center"|F || align="left"|Georgetown || align="center"|1 || align="center"| || 53 || 1,230 || 347 || 61 || 345 || 23.2 || 6.5 || 1.2 || 6.5 || align=center|
|-
|align="left"| || align="center"|F/C || align="left"|North Carolina || align="center"|4 || align="center"|– || 223 || 3,034 || 977 || 173 || 1,052 || 13.6 || 4.4 || 0.8 || 4.7 || align=center|
|-
|align="left"| || align="center"|G/F || align="left"|Iowa State || align="center"|1 || align="center"| || 25 || 508 || 51 || 66 || 190 || 20.3 || 2.0 || 2.6 || 7.6 || align=center|
|-
|align="left"| || align="center"|G || align="left"|Wichita State || align="center"|2 || align="center"|– || 106 || 1,281 || 146 || 88 || 713 || 12.1 || 1.4 || 0.8 || 6.7 || align=center|
|-
|align="left"| || align="center"|C || align="left"|Cincinnati || align="center"|1 || align="center"| || 43 || 448 || 163 || 15 || 199 || 10.4 || 3.8 || 0.3 || 4.6 || align=center|
|-
|align="left"| || align="center"|F || align="left"|Nevada || align="center"|1 || align="center"| || 2 || 2 || 0 || 0 || 0 || 1.0 || 0.0 || 0.0 || 0.0 || align=center|
|-
|align="left"| || align="center"|F || align="left"|Notre Dame || align="center"|5 || align="center"|– || 354 || 10,423 || 1,679 || 662 || 6,146 || 29.4 || 4.7 || 1.9 || 17.4 || align=center|
|-
|align="left"| || align="center"|G || align="left"|Marquette || align="center"|1 || align="center"| || 64 || 945 || 115 || 115 || 235 || 14.8 || 1.8 || 1.8 || 3.7 || align=center|
|-
|align="left"| || align="center"|G || align="left"|Virginia Tech || align="center"|1 || align="center"| || 5 || 20 || 1 || 0 || 5 || 4.0 || 0.2 || 0.0 || 1.0 || align=center|
|-
|align="left"| || align="center"|G/F || align="left"|Germany || align="center"|2 || align="center"|– || 98 || 1,667 || 256 || 82 || 458 || 17.0 || 2.6 || 0.8 || 4.7 || align=center|
|}

References

External links
Chicago Bulls all-time roster

Roster
National Basketball Association all-time rosters